Ron Clark Ball (born July 24, 1959) is an American thriller and suspense novelist from McLean, Virginia, and the author of Falcon on the Tower (2007), .  A former Officer and Naval Aviator who flew the F-14 Tomcat and served in the United States Navy during Operation Desert Storm, his fictional novel Falcon on the Tower is a lauded debut suspense thriller that tackles issues of radical Islamic global terrorism and the establishment of a fanatical Islamic Caliphate in the 21st Century, and the collision of that caliphate with the democracy of the Western free world. In addition to fiction, Ron Clark Ball has also written and lectured extensively on the increasing threat to National Security and damage to the Aerospace and Defense Industries by cyber attack using counterfeit and cloned electronic components and microchips manufactured in China.

References

External links

 
 
 
 Barnes&Noble.com author page
 Apple iTunes Books
 fictiondb author page

1959 births
Living people
American male novelists
American thriller writers
21st-century American novelists
20th-century American novelists
20th-century American male writers
Bolles School alumni
21st-century American male writers